The following is a list of recorded songs by American rapper Tupac Shakur.

1994- Loyal to the Game (2Pac feat. Treach & Riddler) - Regulate (single) (Prod. Reginald Heard)

1996- High 'Til I Die - Sunset Park (soundtrack) (Prod. Tony Pizarro)

See also
 Tupac Shakur discography

Songs
Tupac Shakur